The Wenatchee Fire FC was an American indoor soccer team founded in 2005. WFFC presently compete in the Western Indoor Soccer League. Wenatchee Fire play their home matches at the Wenatchee Valley Sportsplex in Wenatchee, Washington.

The team is a former member of both the Professional Arena Soccer League and Premier Arena Soccer League.

Year-by-year

Playoff record

References

External links
Official website

Western Indoor Soccer League teams
Indoor soccer clubs in the United States
Soccer clubs in Washington (state)
2005 establishments in Washington (state)
Association football clubs established in 2005
Wenatchee, Washington